Fabienne In-Albon (born 5 September 1986) is a Swiss professional golfer.

In-Albon played college golf at Purdue University for one year. And then finished her Bachelor Degree in Sport Management in Australia at the International College of Management Sydney ICMS.

In-Albon turned professional in 2012 and played on the LET Access Series (LETAS). On the 2013 LETAS, she won the Azores Ladies Open and finished 5th on the Order of Merit to earn her Ladies European Tour card for 2014.

In-Albon has played on the Ladies European Tour since 2014. In 2014, she finished second at the Hero Women's Indian Open. She finishing 50th on the money list for the 2014 season to retain privileges for the 2015 season.

In-Albon played in the 2016 Summer Olympics.

LET Access Series wins
2013 Azores Ladies Open

Team appearances
Amateur
Espirito Santo Trophy (representing Switzerland): 2004, 2006
European Ladies' Team Championship (representing Switzerland): 2005

References

External links

Swiss female golfers
Purdue Boilermakers women's golfers
Ladies European Tour golfers
Olympic golfers of Switzerland
Golfers at the 2016 Summer Olympics
People from Zug
Sportspeople from the canton of Zug
1986 births
Living people
21st-century Swiss women